Mihtarlam, also spelled Mehtar Lam, is the sixteenth-largest city of Afghanistan. It is the capital of Laghman Province and center of Mihtarlam District. It is the only large urban settlement in the province. The town is situated in the valley formed by the Alishang and Alingar rivers, 47 km northwest of the city of Jalalabad. There is a paved road between the cities that takes approximately one hour to travel by car.

On 13 August 2021, Mihtarlam was seized by Taliban fighters, becoming the twenty-third provincial capital to be captured by the Taliban as part of the wider 2021 Taliban offensive.

Etymology 
Mihtarlam is, according to local legend, named after Lamech, the father of Noah. In the Persian language, 'mihtar' means headman, lord or chief. Lam is Noah's father's name.

History
Amir Habibullah Khan built Qala-e-Seraj c. 1912–13 in Mihtarlam.

On 6 February 2006, two people were killed by police in riots in Mihtarlam in events of the Jyllands-Posten Muhammad cartoons controversy.

On 26 February 2017, two students were killed and seven others wounded when a rocket landed in Shaheed Mawlawi Abdul Rahman School in Basram. On 14 April 2019, at least seven children were killed when unexploded ordnance detonated in Basram on the outskirts of Mihtarlam.

Local officials spent 22 million Afs to rebuild Qala-e-Seraj in 2020.

On 2 May 2020, a motorbike bomb exploded outside the provincial prison in Mihtarlam, killing three civilians and injuring four members of the Afghan security forces. Noor Mohammad, director of Laghman's provincial prison directorate, was among the injured. On 5 October 2020, Provincial Governor of Laghman, Rahmatullah Yarmal, was slightly wounded after his convoy was targeted by a suicide car bomber.

On 24 May 2021, Afghan government forces clashed with Taliban militants in Mihtarlam.

Climate
Mihtarlam has a cold semi-arid climate (Köppen climate classification BSk).

Places of interest 
Qala-e-Seraj
Hajji Dunya Gul Niazi Jamia Masjid
Laghman University
The Tomb of Lamech is located in the area. Ghaznavid Sultan Mahmud of Ghazni built the shrine, amid gardens, over the site of his presumed grave, 50 kilometres from Mihtarlam.

Sports 
In 2021, the first stadium in Laghman opened in Mihtarlam.

See also 

 List of cities in Afghanistan

References

Populated places in Laghman Province
Populated places along the Silk Road
History of Laghman Province
Provincial capitals in Afghanistan
Populated places with period of establishment missing